Equate or equating may refer to:
 Equate, a brand name of Walmart
 Equate (game), board game manufactured by Conceptual Math Media
 Equate, a production joint venture in Kuwait between that country's government and Dow Chemical Company
 Equating, statistical process of determining comparable scores on different forms of an exam